The Iraq men's national squash team represents Iraq in international squash team competitions, and is governed by Iraqi Squash Federation.

Current team
 Rassol Al Sultani
 Mohammed Hasan
 Husham Abdulkareem Sabeh
 Faisal Assim

Results

World Team Squash Championships

Asian Squash Team Championships

See also 
 Iraqi Squash Federation
 World Team Squash Championships

References 

Squash teams
Men's national squash teams
Squash
Men's sport in Iraq